WONG (1150 AM) is a radio station licensed to serve Canton, Mississippi. The station is owned by Marion R. Williams.  It airs an Urban AC and Gospel music format.

The station was assigned these call letters by the Federal Communications Commission on April 1, 1986.

References

External links

Gospel radio stations in the United States
ONG
Urban adult contemporary radio stations in the United States
Radio stations established in 1989
1989 establishments in Mississippi
ONG